Marie-Élisabeth Joly (1761 – 1798), was a French stage actress.

She was engaged at the Comédie-Française in 1781. She became a Sociétaires of the Comédie-Française in 1783.

She had a successful career and was particularly noted for her roles as a soubrette. She was popular among the audience and her premature death aroused much public sympathy.

References

External links 
  "Joly", Marie-Élisabeth Joly, dite Mme", Comédie-Française

1761 births
1798 deaths
18th-century French actresses
French stage actresses